Vashlovani Strict Nature Reserve is a protected area in Dedoplistsqaro Municipality, Kakheti region of Georgia on Shiraqi mountain range and Georgian bank of Alazani River, at elevation 300-600 meters above sea level.

The total protected area is 10,143 hectares, with forest at 4.032 ha, and the rest are fields, desert, ravines. The purpose of the Nature Reserve is to protect  and preserve rare species of rare forest flora and fauna.

Flora 
Protected forest mostly has pine tree and juniper. There are also Celtis, Pyrus salicifolia, pomegranate, Prunus mahaleb, Spiraea, Paliurus and wild pistachio tree (Pistacia mutica).

Fauna 
There are many species of birds: Rock partridge, Griffon vulture, Eurasian golden oriole, Mistle thrush, including near threatened Cinereous vultures (Aegypius monachus).
Mammals are represented by wild boar, rabbit, fox, wolf, bear, striped hyena, European badger and leopard (Panthera pardus).

Climate 
In terms of climate this is the most dry and harsh region in Georgia. Climate is characterized by dryness and heat.

See also 
Vashlovani National Park
Iori Plateau

References 

National parks of Georgia (country)
Protected areas established in 1935
Geography of Kakheti
Azerbaijan–Georgia (country) border